is a former Japanese football player.

Playing career
Mochizuki was born in Shizuoka Prefecture on May 20, 1972. After graduating from Doshisha University, he joined Japan Football League club Kyoto Purple Sanga in 1995. The club was promoted to J1 League from 1996. Although he played many matches as defensive midfielder in early 1996, his opportunity to play decreased in late and retired end of 1996 season.

Club statistics

References

External links

kyotosangadc

1972 births
Living people
Doshisha University alumni
Association football people from Shizuoka Prefecture
Japanese footballers
J1 League players
Japan Football League (1992–1998) players
Kyoto Sanga FC players
Association football midfielders